Marking Time was an Australian television mini-series, consisting of four one-hour episodes. It first aired on 9 and 10 November 2003 on ABC-TV. Directed by Cherie Nowlan and written by John Doyle, it was the first mainstream television/film project to address the issue of the Australian government's refugee policy, a topic it approaches by chronicling the emotional journey of one young man during his year off after graduation, in his fictional rural home-town of Brackley, Australia.

The storyline of Marking Time was inspired by the real-life experiences of Afghan refugees and their hosts in the rural town of Young, New South Wales; however much of the outdoor scenes of the series were actually shot at Singleton, New South Wales, in the Hunter Region.

Plot
An Afghan father and his daughter, Randa (Bojana Novakovic), arrive in Australia to escape the Taliban. At school Randa is teased for her religion and wearing a hijab. The main character who finished secondary school the previous year, Hal (Abe Forsythe) begins to feel sorry for her and over a course falls in love with her. Although her father initially allows them to date, there is a lot of tension with their culture differences (Randa is a practising Muslim, Hal an atheist).

Soon after the September 11th attacks, Randa's father's house is destroyed by an intentionally lit fire. Hal's father (Morrell) offers them shelter in his house. Later that night, Randa, afraid, sneaks into Hal's room seeking comfort. The two sleep together and are later found in bed by her father. Upset by what has happened, he leaves and refuses to let Hal see Randa.

Hal and Randa continue to see each other in secret, Randa admitting she 'did not regret' what she did with Hal. Eventually their refugee status is rejected and they are ordered to return. Hal and his father try valiantly to think of a way to keep them there, but come up empty handed. Finally Hal, decides that he loves Randa and offers to run away from the law with her. He tells his plan to his father who initially disapproves, but after seeing how much they love each other, allows. He also tells Randa's father, who is initially reluctant. Hal promises to take care of her and her father agrees, realising that Randa will be deported with him unless she leaves. Randa is initially reluctant to leave her father, but ultimately agrees.

They leave on the night of Randa's deportation. Stopping off in a hotel room, they make love tenderly one last time. When Hal awakes, Randa is gone. She leaves him a note explaining she can not leave her father or get him or her father into trouble. He returns, but is too late as he sees Randa and her father on a bus for deportation.

Eventually he decides to go overseas to look for her. He uses the money his mother left to him to buy a plane ticket and the series ends with Hal unsure about what will happen in his search for his love.

Cast

 Abe Forsythe - Hal Fleming
 Geoff Morrell - Geoff Fleming
 Elena Carapetis - Gemma
 Bojana Novakovic - Randa
 Matthew Le Nevez - Bullet Sheather
 Abbie Cornish - Tracey
 Katie Wall - Belinda

 Gyton Grantley - Shane Sheather
Scott Swalwell - Jamie
 Lech Mackiewicz - Hassan
 Graeme Blundell - Ralph Dare
 Anthony Simcoe - Scott Seaton
Brian Meegan - Ross Ferguson
Matthew Lilley - Todd Paynter

Barbara Morton - Marie Stockard
 Ian Bliss - Col Bryant
Paul Pantano - Remus Migotso
Thea Gumbert - Katey
 Arianthe Galani - Mrs. Spiro
Sharin Contini - Constable Welch
Dave Rondo - Cos

Rhonda Doyle - Aunt Holly
Ben Tate - Troy
Adam Cahill - Troy's mate
Sueyan Cox - Aunty Sarah
Andrew Harris - Salesman
Cecil Parkee - Billy Chan
Shauna Jensen - Wedding Singer
Megan Dickinson - Flower Girl

Abe Forsythe and Bojana Novakovic already knew each other as they went to primary school together .

Awards and nominations

Awards

Won a record 7 AFI Awards in 2004.

Nominations

References

External links
Marking Time at the National Film and Sound Archive
 

Australian drama television series
2000s Australian television miniseries
2003 Australian television series debuts
2003 Australian television series endings
Films directed by Cherie Nowlan